Hoplia argentea is a species of scarabaeid beetle belonging to the subfamily Melolonthinae.

Subspecies
Subspecies include:
Hoplia argentea var. coerulipennis Della Beffa
Hoplia argentea var. karamani Reitter, 1893
Hoplia argentea var. viridula Mulsant, 1842

Distribution
These flower-loving scarabs, quite common in the mountains, are present in most of Europe (Albania, Austria, Belgium, Croatia, Czech Republic, France, Germany, Greece, Hungary, Italy, Luxembourg, Macedonia, Montenegro, Romania, Serbia, Slovakia, Slovenia, Spain, Switzerland).

Habitat
These beetles inhabit open landscapes, parks, mixed forests, gardens, forest edges and meadows.

Description

It is a very variable chromatic species. The body of these medium-sized flower-loving scarabs is covered with pale green, bluish-green or yellow ocher scales. The scales produce interference colors (as with butterflies). Old specimens lose most of the scales, changing their color from green to brown. Like other species of the genus Hoplia, it has fairly long hind legs terminated by a single nail. The legs in males are black with longer hind legs, while in the female they are reddish and the body colour is usually brown.

Biology
Adults can mostly be encountered  from May through September in orchards, meadows and clearings feeding on pollen of flowers, especially Apiaceae species. The larvae develop in the soil feeding on roots of various plants during the summer, then hibernate, emerging as adults in spring.

References

External links
 Bugguide
 .shtml Les insectes 
 Galerie Insecte

Melolonthinae
Beetles of Europe
Beetles described in 1761
Articles containing video clips
Taxa named by Nikolaus Poda von Neuhaus